Pittsville is a city in Wood County, Wisconsin, United States. The population was 874 at the 2010 census.

History
Pittsville was platted in 1883, and named after Oliver W. Pitts, the proprietor of a local sawmill.

Geography
Pittsville is located at  (44.440409, -90.128249).

Demographics

2010 census
As of the census of 2010, there were 874 people, 338 households, and 238 families living in the city. The racial makeup of the city was 97.9% White, 0.3% Native American, 0.8% Asian, and 0.9% from two or more races. Hispanic or Latino of any race were 0.8% of the population.

There were 338 households, of which 35.2% had children under the age of 18 living with them, 55.0% were married couples living together, 10.7% had a female householder with no husband present, 4.7% had a male householder with no wife present, and 29.6% were non-families. 25.4% of all households were made up of individuals, and 11.3% had someone living alone who was 65 years of age or older. The average household size was 2.55 and the average family size was 3.03.

The median age in the city was 36 years. 27.5% of residents were under the age of 18; 7.2% were between the ages of 18 and 24; 26% were from 25 to 44; 24.9% were from 45 to 64; and 14.5% were 65 years of age or older. The gender makeup of the city was 50.0% male and 50.0% female.

2000 census
As of the census of 2000, there were 866 people, 331 households, and 238 families living in the city. The population density was 432.9 people per square mile (167.2/km2). There were 351 housing units at an average density of 175.5 per square mile (67.8/km2). The racial makeup of the city was 98.96% White, 0.12% African American, 0.35% Native American, 0.12% from other races, and 0.46% from two or more races. Hispanic or Latino of any race were 0.23% of the population.

There were 331 households, out of which 39.0% had children under the age of 18 living with them, 57.7% were married couples living together, 9.7% had a female householder with no husband present, and 27.8% were non-families. 25.7% of all households were made up of individuals, and 12.1% had someone living alone who was 65 years of age or older. The average household size was 2.60 and the average family size was 3.08.

In the city, the population was spread out, with 29.2% under the age of 18, 8.4% from 18 to 24, 30.8% from 25 to 44, 19.4% from 45 to 64, and 12.1% who were 65 years of age or older. The median age was 34 years. For every 100 females, there were 100.9 males. For every 100 females age 18 and over, there were 97.1 males.

The median income for a household in the city was $36,750, and the median income for a family was $41,964. Males had a median income of $30,500 versus $20,625 for females. The per capita income for the city was $16,257. About 2.2% of families and 5.4% of the population were below the poverty line, including 5.4% of those under age 18 and 12.3% of those age 65 or over.

Notable people
Red Blanchard, country musician
Amos E. Germer, Wisconsin legislator and lawyer
MaryAnn Lippert, Wisconsin legislator and educator

Education
The city is also home to the Pittsville School District, which has a school population of about 600 students.

References

External links
 City of Pittsville
 Sanborn fire insurance maps: 1894 1914
 Maps from plat books: 1909 1928

Cities in Wisconsin
Cities in Wood County, Wisconsin